The Dvora-class fast patrol boat is a fast class of patrol boats built by Israel Aerospace Industries for the Israeli Sea Corps based on the Israeli .

Operational history

Sri Lanka 
The Dvora class has become the work horse of the Sri Lanka Navy which has deployed it since the mid-1980s to counter LTTE operations at sea. Since then Dvoras have been made in Sri Lanka and has been the basis for the more advanced Colombo class fast patrol boat built by the Colombo Dockyard Limited and used by South Asian navies to counter terrorism.

Taiwan 
The Republic of China Navy uses Dvoras as Fast Attack Missile Craft, purchasing two and using them as a pattern for the almost-identical, locally-built Hai Ou-class missile boats (Hai Ou class has three propeller shafts whereas Dvora class has two), 50 built. Both classes, being an anti-ship asset, are armed with additional two Hsiung Feng I anti-ship missiles and have been in ROCN service for over 20 years.

Operators 

 Israeli Sea Corps - 9 (Initially 10 were in service, 1 decommissioned after collision with a rocky shoal)

 Sri Lanka Navy - 4 (2 acquired in 1984 and 4 in 1986; 3 sunk in 1993, 1995 and 1996). 

 Republic of China Navy - 2 original Dvora acquired in the 1980s and 48 local variant version Hai Ou-class (Seagull), retired beginning in 1999 to 2012 (replaced by 30 Kuang Hua VI-class missile boats); originally 26 with 6 gifted to Gambia and Paraguay.
 
 Four units (ex-ROCN/Taiwan Navy FABG-7, FABG-11, FABG-29 and FABG-32) received from Taiwan in 2009 as patrol gunboats. All 4 were originally slated for Republic of Malawi in 2008.
 
 Two units (ex-ROCN/Taiwan Navy FABG-1 and FABG-2) received from Taiwan in 1994 as patrol gunboats.

References

External links 
www.israeli-weapons.com 
Hai Ou-class [Dvora] Fast Attack Missile Craft, globalsecurity.org

Patrol boat classes
Naval ships of Israel
Ships of the Sri Lanka Navy
Missile boats of the Republic of China Navy
Ships built in the Republic of China
Ships built in Israel